Robert Alexander Suárez Subero (born March 1, 1991) is a Venezuelan professional baseball pitcher for the San Diego Padres of Major League Baseball (MLB). He previously played for the Fukuoka SoftBank Hawks and Hanshin Tigers of Nippon Professional Baseball (NPB).

Career

Saraperos de Saltillo
On April 16, 2015, Suárez signed with the Saraperos de Saltillo of the Mexican League. In 43 games for Saltillo, Suárez logged a 5–0 win–loss record and 1.71 earned run average (ERA) with 48 strikeouts.

Fukuoka SoftBank Hawks
On November 2, 2015, Suarez signed with the Fukuoka SoftBank Hawks of Nippon Professional Baseball (NPB)
. 

On April 10, 2016, Suarez made his NPB debut. In 2016, he finished the regular season with a 2–6 record, a 3.19 ERA, 64 strikeouts, 26 holds, and one save in 53 2/3 innings.

On February 8, 2017, Suarez was selected to the Venezuela national baseball team for the 2017 World Baseball Classic. On March 12, he injured his right elbow in a game against Mexico. He had Tommy John surgery on April 14. 

On August 11, 2018, Suarez pitched in the Pacific League against the Hokkaido Nippon-Ham Fighters for the first time in two years.  He finished the regular season with 11 games pitched, a 1–1 win–loss record, a 6.30 ERA, 3 holds, and 10 strikeouts in 10 innings. 

Suarez finished the 2019 regular season with 9 Games pitched, a 0–4 Win–loss record, a 5.74ERA, and 27 strikeouts in 26 2/3 innings. He pitched in the 2019 Japan Series. On November 28, the Fukuoka SoftBank Hawks announced that the team would not re-sign Suárez for next season. On December 2, 2019, he became free agent.

Hanshin Tigers
On December 19, 2019, Suárez signed with the Hanshin Tigers of the NPB. In 2020, Suárez pitched to a 2.24 ERA over 52.1 innings.

On December 2, 2020, he became a free agent. On December 24, Suárez re-signed with the Tigers. On June 13, 2021, Suárez set a Hanshin club record by recording a save in his 12th consecutive mound appearance, breaking the previous record of 11 held by former Tigers pitcher Kyuji Fujikawa. On June 30, Suárez’s streak ended when he came in to pitch in a tie game, with the new record being set at 14 consecutive mound appearances with a save.

San Diego Padres
On December 1, 2021, Suárez signed a one-year contract with a 2023 player option with the San Diego Padres.  

On April 7, 2022, Suárez made his major league debut against the Arizona Diamondbacks, walking the first two batters he faced on a combined nine pitches before throwing a wild pitch, and then a hitting a batter. Suárez was removed from the game without having recorded an out. All three runners he allowed later scored, earning him the loss.

On November 17, 2022 the Padres signed Suárez to a 5-year, $46 million contract.

Personal 
Albert Suárez is his brother, who pitches in the KBO League for the Samsung Lions.

References

External links

NPB stats

1991 births
Living people
Fukuoka SoftBank Hawks players
Hanshin Tigers players
San Diego Padres players
Major League Baseball pitchers
Mexican League baseball pitchers
Nippon Professional Baseball pitchers
Saraperos de Saltillo players
Major League Baseball players from Venezuela
Venezuelan expatriate baseball players in Japan
Venezuelan expatriate baseball players in Mexico
World Baseball Classic players of Venezuela
2017 World Baseball Classic players
People from Bolívar (state)